Lino Anthony Graglia (January 22, 1930January 30, 2022) was the A. W. Walker Centennial Chair in Law at the University of Texas specializing in antitrust litigation. He earned a BA from the City College of New York in 1952, and an LLB from Columbia University in 1954, before working in the Eisenhower administration's United States Department of Justice. He thereafter practiced law in Washington, D.C., and New York City before joining the University of Texas' law school in 1966.<ref>[https://books.google.com/books?id=su8BCgfnxacC&pg=PR16&lpg=PR16&dq=Lino+Graglia+%22University+of+Texas%22+1963&source=web&ots=7_PVC3FBld&sig=pjfCodeij1jmZNAlkPCIblDze6o&hl=en&sa=X&oi=book_result&resnum=6&ct=result Paul, Miller, and Paul. Freedom of Speech, Volume 21, list of contributors.]</ref>

As a legal academic, Graglia was very conservative. He was a critic of affirmative action and racial quotas, and a critic of some aspects of judicial review, believing that the courts are an illegitimate avenue for securing social change.

His wife, F. Carolyn Graglia, is an author who has written a book critical of feminism entitled Domestic Tranquility: A Brief Against Feminism.

Graglia died on January 30, 2022, in Austin, Texas.

 Failed nomination to the Fifth Circuit 

In the mid-1980s, Graglia was considered by President Ronald Reagan for a newly created federal judgeship on the United States Court of Appeals for the Fifth Circuit, but he eventually was withdrawn in late spring 1986 due to controversy over articles Graglia had written about desegregation busing as well as remarks Graglia made which were alleged to be racially insensitive.  The following year, Reagan nominated Jerry Edwin Smith to the seat to which Graglia had been nominated, and Smith was confirmed easily.

 Racist remarks 
Graglia made a speech on UT campus in 1997 in which he said that "blacks and Mexican-Americans can't compete academically with whites." The speech was at a meeting of the Students for Equal Opportunity on the topic of the Hopwood v. Texas case, which ended discrimination against UT Law applicants who were not members of a designated "minority" group. The comment was widely reported and generated discussions across the country.

In an article titled The Affirmative Action Fraud, published in 1999 in the Journal of Urban and Contemporary Law, Graglia cited The Bell Curve, a book by professor Richard J. Herrnstein and American Enterprise Institute political scientist Charles Murray, to assert the following:

In 2009 Graglia was a speaker at a conference organized by white separatist Michael H. Hart on the claimed need to defend "America's Judeo-Christian heritage and European identity."

In 2012, he suggested that blacks and Hispanics are falling behind in education because they are increasingly raised in single-parent families.

WritingsDisaster by Decree: The Supreme  Court's Decision on Race and the Schools, Cornell University Press, Ithaca, N.Y., 1976, The Supreme Court's Busing Decisions: A Study in Government by the Judiciary, International Institute for Economic Research, Los Angeles, 1978, Courting Disaster: The Supreme Court and the Demise of Popular Government'', Institute of United States Studies, University of London, London, 1997,

Notes

External links
Web page at UT

1930 births
2022 deaths
American legal scholars
American people of Italian descent
City College of New York alumni
Columbia Law School alumni
University of Texas faculty
People associated with Covington & Burling